Friedrich Egon (Fritz) Scherfke, (7 September 1909 – 15 September 1983) was an ethnic German who became an interwar football midfield player for the Poland national football team. He is still one of the all time leading goalscorers of all time in the top Polish division with 131 goals.

Biography
Scherfke's native city in the Provinz Posen saw a Polish uprising in late 1918, and by the Treaty of Versailles became officially part of the Second Polish Republic in 1920 when he was 10. He spent most of his career in Warta Poznań, which was one of the best teams of the Polish Soccer League in the 1920s and 1930s, winning the league in 1929 and finishing second in 1928 and 1938. Scherfke also played 12 games for the Polish national team, scoring 2 goals. His debut occurred on 2 October 1932 in a 2-1 win against Latvia. He participated in the 1936 Olympic Games in Berlin, where Poland finished fourth, playing in games against Hungary (3-0) and Great Britain (5-4). On 5 June 1938 he also scored the first goal for Poland in the 1938 FIFA World Cup, playing against Brazil in Strasbourg, France. Poland lost 5-6 and Scherfke netted on the penalty kick in the 23rd minute.

During the Second World War, as Volksdeutscher (ethnic German), he was called up to the Wehrmacht. In February 1940 he became director of the football section in the administration of the new region Reichsgau Wartheland. After two months he was replaced by an officer of the Wehrmacht. Also in February 1940 he became president and captain of the new German club 1. FC Posen. In this position he managed to protect some former soccer team mates from persecution by the Nazis. Among those Poles he helped were goalkeeper of Warta, Marian Fontowicz (captured by the Wehrmacht during Polish September Campaign), wife of Zbigniew Szulc, another Warta's goalie (German authorities planned to send her to Germany as OST-Arbeiter), Warta's forward Bolesław Gendera (arrested for playing football), and Michał Flieger, who with Warta was Polish Champion in 1929.

When the 1. FC Posen came under the control of the Luftwaffe and changed its name to Luftwaffen Sportverein Posen in October 1940 Scherfke left the club and ended his career as football player at the age of 31. In 1942 he informed his Polish friends that he could not help them any more, he felt himself observed by the Gestapo. In 1943 he was commanded to the Eastern Front, and later to Yugoslavia. Wounded in January 1945 in Yugoslavia, at the end of the war he was captured as POW by British soldiers. He was released on 25 July 1945 and found a new home in West Berlin, where he opened a furniture store. In early 1980s, he sold the store and moved to Eschborn near Frankfurt am Main. Scherfke died in the hospital of Bad Soden in the region of Frankfurt .

See also
 Polish Roster in World Cup Soccer France 1938
 Ernst Willimowski
 Władysław Szczepaniak

References

1909 births
1983 deaths
Polish people of German descent
Footballers from Poznań
People from the Province of Posen
Poland international footballers
Olympic footballers of Poland
Footballers at the 1936 Summer Olympics
1938 FIFA World Cup players
Warta Poznań players
Ekstraklasa players
Polish footballers
Association football midfielders
German prisoners of war in World War II held by the United Kingdom
German Army personnel of World War II